Frankenstein's Aunt is the protagonist of three novels - two by Allan Rune Pettersson and a seven-episode TV miniseries based on the first one. The story is a humorous homage to the Universal Horror Frankenstein films.

Novels

Frankenstein's Aunt

Although the later TV series is based on the first novel by Allan Rune Pettersson, there are many differences in the TV series: Characters were edited out and added, the story was changed and expanded, and it has another ending.

Frankenstein's Aunt Returns

The book is a direct sequel to the first novel and therefore does not revive the story of the TV series.

Third novel

A novel by Werner Meier was published in German in Austria in 1987 which retells the story of the TV series with almost no differences. The book has the title Frankensteins Tante which means Frankenstein's Aunt.

Television series

Story
Similar to the first book by Allan Rune Pettersson, Aunt Hannah comes to Frankenstein with the aim of finding a bride for her nephew so that the family will gain some little Frankensteins. He, however, is too busy for anything like that. He tries to create a man with the power of a machine and the brain of a genius. Unlike in the novel, Aunt Hannah meets more spooks like a merman, a fire spirit and a White Lady and the orphan Max, who is running away from a circus.

Intention
The makers of "Frankenstein's Aunt" Jaroslav Dietl and Juraj Jakubisko interpreted the classic Frankenstein theme in a humourful way tending to parody. But they did not only want to entertain the audience, but to emphasize the triumph of reason and sanity over human aggressiveness and intolerance.

Production
The director J. Jakubisko about the production: "This seven country co-production was a challenge for me. The producers' wish was to see spooks from every single culture so it would be familiar for children around the world. So we found ourselves in Babylon during the production - many languages, many spooks"

The series was an international co-production from:

Taurus Film Munich (Germany)
MR-Film (Austria)
Československá  Bratislava (Czechoslovakia)
Films du Sabre and FR-3 (France)
SVT 1 (Sweden)
Raiuno (Italy) and
TVE (Spain).

Filming location were Hallstatt, the environ of Salzburg, Dachstein, Boskovice and Werfen with Burg Hohenwerfen.

Jacques Herlin, who played Igor, said in an interview,
that the filming was a lot of fun, the only bad side being Viveca Lindfors who hated the director from the first day.
According to him, she said to the director: "As far as I'm concerned, you're a shit. I've signed the contract, but won't agree with you. My character will smoke a cigar, even if you don't like it. Go fuck yourself".
Nevertheless, Herlin added that he actually liked Viveca. He described the director as crazy - a poet, ex painter and friend of Fellini.

The character of the "White Lady" (played by Mercedes Sampietro) was inspired in Elizabeth Bathory (1560–1614).  She is thought to have tortured hundreds of maids to death, and according to the legend she was cursed to haunt her castle. Her character in the series was moderated, similarities are still the same first name and some insinuations.
The series' director, Juraj Jakubisko made also Bathory, a movie about her, which was released in 2008.

Ferdy Mayne, who played Count Dracula, played a similar character as Count Krolock in The Fearless Vampire Killers (1967).

Cast
Viveca Lindfors - Hannah von Frankenstein
Martin Hreben - Max
Gerhard Karzel - Albert
Barbara De Rossi - Klara
Eddie Constantine - Alois - Water Spirit
Flavio Bucci - Talbot - Werewolf
Ferdy Mayne - Count Dracula
Mercedes Sampietro - Elisabeth
Tilo Prückner - Sepp
Bolek Polívka - Henry Frankenstein
Marie Drahokoupilová - Mrs. Karch
Gail Gatterburg - Bertha
Sancho Gracia - Investigation Judge
Jacques Herlin - Igor
Andrej Hryc - Schmied
Milan Lasica - Teacher
Roman Skamene - Hans

Episodes
The Birth
The Clean-Up
The Bride
The Cradle
The Ladies' Man
The Car
The Wedding

Alternative and other versions
A recut of the series in a 96-minute movie was made with the title Freckled Max and the Spooks.

A musical for schools is based on the novel of Allan Rune Petterson.

Nomination
In 1988 it was nominated best film in the International Fantasy Film Awards.

Video release
The series was first released on DVD in Germany on March 17, 2008. This is currently the only release of the series on video so far and includes only the German-language version.

Notes

Literature
 Allan Rune Pettersson: Frankenstein's Aunt,

External links

Director's site with information about the series, by episode (with plot detail)
kinobox.cz entry
Intro of Frankenstein's Aunt

Austrian television miniseries
Works based on Frankenstein
1980s television miniseries
1980s Austrian television series

cs:Teta (seriál)
de:Frankensteins Tante (Fernsehserie)
es:La tía de Frankenstein
fr:La Tante de Frankenstein
it:La zia di Frankenstein